Falling Out is the debut studio album by Millbrook, Ontario singer Serena Ryder, released in Peterborough, Ontario, Canada in December 1999 by the independent record label Mime Radio.

Track listing
"Falling Out (song)"
"Walking Slowly"
"Time"
"Orderly Refrain"
"Brown Haired Boy"
"The Tight Way"
"The Perfect Mirror"
"Crazy Boy"
"Box Under Your Bed"
"Hey Mister + Brown Haired Boy (different arrangement with drums) - hidden track"

References

1999 debut albums
Serena Ryder albums